Romeo is a 2007 Malayalam romantic comedy film written by Rafi Mecartin and directed by Rajasenan, starring Dileep, Vimala Raman, Sruthi Lakshmi and Samvrutha Sunil in the lead roles Romeo was a commercial success at the box-office.

Plot
Manu Krishnan is a male nurse in a reputed hospital. He is the son of Ratheesh Kumar, a film junior artist and Lakshmikutty, an ex singer and a judge in a reality show. He has a special relationship with Dr. Priya, but is also in love with Leena, the star contestant in a popular music reality show (where Manu's mother is one of the judges). Manu goes in search of a job and arrives at an Agraharam to take care of a mentally ill patient. A girl from the Agraharam, Bhama falls in love with him. Now the three girls want to marry Manu but neither of their parents want to have Manu as their son-in-law. The rest of the movie is about the trouble Manu goes through when the three meet, and whom he decides to marry.

Cast

Soundtrack

The songs were composed by Alex Paul and lyrics were penned by Vayalar Sarath Chandra Varma.

References

External links
 

2000s Malayalam-language films
2007 films
2007 romantic comedy films
Indian romantic comedy films
Films directed by Rajasenan